Rehoboth is a town in central Namibia just north of the Tropic of Capricorn. Located 90 kilometres (55 miles) south of the Namibian capital Windhoek, Rehoboth lies on a high elevation plateau with several natural hot-water springs. In 2005, it had a population of 21,378 later increased to 28,843 in 2011, according to the 2011 Namibian Population and Housing Census.

Rehoboth is intersected from north to south by the national road B1, which also serves as the border of the two electoral constituencies in the town, Rehoboth Urban West and Rehoboth Urban East. Rehoboth is the core territory of the Baster community which still lives according to their Paternal Laws which were enacted in 1872.

Administration 
Rehoboth is divided into eight neighbourhoods, called blocks. The oldest part of the town is blocks A, B and C, of which block B contains most public services and shops. Block D is home to the wealthiest inhabitants of the town.  Block E is the poorest neighbourhood and was originally (under Apartheid) designated for blacks. Blocks F, G and H are the newest neighbourhoods. The current mayor of the town is Mr. Pieters, living in Block E.

Public amenities include a public hospital, primary and secondary schools and a district court with resident magistrate. The Oanob Dam, approximately six kilometres (4 miles) from Rehoboth, supplies the town with fresh water.  The majority of the population consists of Basters.

History 

The aboriginals of Rehoboth and its surroundings are the now seemingly extinct and or greatly assimilated/ accultured San (Haiǁom) and the Damaras, of the ǃAinîn traditional community (or rather the Dama of the ǃAib [aka ǀHūǃgaoben]), a sub clan of the ǀGowanîn (Dune Damaras/ Damaras of the Kalahari). They first came upon the hot water springs after the fall of the Damara cohession in the 16th century and named the site ǀGaoǁnāǀaus (Fountain of the falling buffalo).  The ǃAinîn later permanently settled at ǃNawases  NE of Rehoboth in the mid 1700s under the reign of chief Xomaǀkhāb (third in line of chieftain chronology) circa 1725- (1750). The traditional community is as per post-independent Namibian legislative framework is administered by a traditional authority (ǃAinîn Traditional Authority) under the reign of Kai ǀGarub (regnal title- "Great Leopard") Chief Hans Eichab. ǀGaoǁnāǀaus was later renamed ǀAnes (place of smoke) by the Kaiǁkhaun (Rooinasie Nama of ǃHoaxaǃnâs) who for a short period had settled there before migrating to Hoachanas. The "smoke" referred to the steam that was rising over the hot water fountains on cold winter mornings. The ǀHūǃgaoben decided to settle at a distance from the fauna rich springs of Rehoboth so as not chase away game roaming the site.

In 1845 ǁKhauǀgôan (Swartbooi) clan arrived under the leadership of Willem Swartbooi (ǃHuiseb ǂHaobemâb) and Franz Heinrich Kleinschmidt of the German Rhenish Missionary Society. Kleinschmidt named the place Rehoboth that year, and established a Rhenish Mission Station there. In 1864, the Nama abandoned the area as a result of an attack by the Orlam Afrikaners.
Rehoboth means "streets"  in Hebrew. The arrival of the ǀHôaǀaran (Oorlam Afrikaner) in ǀAeǁgams (Windhoek) in 1840 marked the start of the ǀHôaǀaran-ǁKhauǀgôan (Oorlam Afrikaner-Swartbooi Nama) feud. This feud lasted from 1840 to 1865, as the Oorlam Afrikaner attacked the Swartbooi Nama at Rehoboth in a bloody clash resulting in the Swartbooi Namas fleeing to ǃAmaib in ǃOeǂgâb (Erongo region). The Rehoboth area was mostly bare except the Swartbooi Nama who were sheltered by the ǀHūǃgaoben.

In 1870, the Basters, who had migrated out of the Cape Colony in 1868, moved into the territory and were granted permission to settle at Rehoboth by the participants of the peace conference of Okahandja on 23 September 1870. Within a few years, the Basters were closely linked to the town of Rehoboth and became identified as Rehoboth Basters or Rehobothers.  The population increased rapidly from an initial number of 333 in 1870, 800 in 1874 and 1500 by 1885.  The growing Baster population settled in the surrounding areas, which would become known as the Rehoboth Gebiet.

In 1885, Baster Kaptein Hermanus van Wyk signed a 'Treaty of Protection and Friendship' with the German Empire which permitted him to retain a degree of autonomy in exchange for recognizing colonial rule. Relations between Rehoboth and Germany remained close for more than twenty years, but in 1914, following the outbreak of World War I, Germany's use of Baster soldiers to guard South African prisoners — contrary to the terms of their enlistment — led to armed revolt. German forces then attacked Rehoboth, committed atrocities against Baster civilians and attacked refugees encamped upon the mountain of Sam Khubis, but, despite repeated attacks and the use of superior weaponry, were unable to destroy the Basters' position. On the following day the Germans retreated and Rehoboth's Baster community was reprieved.

Namibia was occupied by South Africa in 1915 and, ten years later, a second rebellion broke out at Rehoboth. This revolt collapsed, however, when colonial forces, armed with machine guns and supported by two warplanes, marched into the town and arrested more than 600 people.

Politics

Administratively, Rehoboth is classified as a town with its own council of 7 elected individuals.

The 2015 local authority election was won by the SWAPO party which gained four seats (4,519 votes), while the local United People's Movement (UPM) gained three seats (3,101 votes). The 2020 local authority election was narrowly won by the newly formed Landless People's Movement (LPM) which scored well all over Hardap. LPM gained 2,468 votes and two seats in the town council, followed by SWAPO with two seats and 2,322 votes. The local Rehoboth Independent Town Management Association also obtained two seats (1,523 votes), and the remaining seat went to the UPM (841 votes).

Transport 
The town is served by Rehoboth railway station. There is also a private landing strip for small aircraft near the Oanob Dam. To the west is Gamsberg Nature Reserve.

People from Rehoboth
 Hermanus Beukes, early petitioner for Namibian independence
 Vernon Cloete, cricketer
 Cliven Loubser, international Rugby Player for Namibia.
 Anicia Peters, Dean of Computing and Informatics at Namibia University of Science and Technology
 Piet Junius, Rehoboth Baster politician

References

External links 
 Rehoboth Basters Site 
 Rehoboth Town Profile 2005 Published by the Town Council
 Video of Rehoboth Town with traditional music by Reho Combo

 
Rhenish mission stations
Populated places in the Hardap Region
1845 establishments in South West Africa
Towns in Namibia